Woodchurch is a suburb of Birkenhead, Wirral, Merseyside, England.  It contains six buildings that are recorded in the National Heritage List for England as designated listed buildings.   Of these, one is listed at Grade II*, the middle of the three grades, and the others are at Grade II, the lowest grade.  The area was rural until the 1940s, since when there has been planned residential development.  The major features in the area are a modern hospital, and Arrowe Hall with its surrounding grounds forming Arrowe Park.  The hall is listed, as are its lodge and entrance.  The other listed buildings are a medieval church, a modern church and a rectory.

Key

Buildings

References

Citations

Sources

Listed buildings in Merseyside
Lists of listed buildings in Merseyside